Lampedusa e Linosa is a comune (municipality) in the Province of Agrigento in the Italian region of Sicily. It includes the isles of Lampedusa, Linosa and Lampione, collectively known as the Pelagie Islands.

Geography
The municipality of Lampedusa e Linosa includes the isles of Lampedusa, Linosa and Lampione, collectively known as the Pelagie Islands.

History
The colonisation of the island of Lampedusa started in 1843 under the Bourbon. The comune of Lampedusa e Linosa was founded on 12 June 1878.

International relations

Twin towns – Sister cities
Lampedusa e Linosa is twinned with:
 Bassano del Grappa, Italy
 We`a, Djibouti

References

External links

 Official website
 Mediterráneo, Italia, Islas Pelágicas, Linosa (in spanish)

 
Cities and towns in Sicily
Coastal towns in Sicily